Shakti Sthal is a memorial in Raj Ghat, New Delhi, India, marking the cremation site of Indira Gandhi. Politicians of the Indian National Congress traditionally visit the monument to pay tributes.

See also 
 Raj Ghat and associated memorials

References 

Cremation
Monuments and memorials in Delhi
Monuments and memorials to Indira Gandhi